The following lists give the communes of France within each department:

Metropolitan France

French overseas departments and territories 

Overseas departments (département d'outre-mer or DOM):

Overseas collectivities (collectivité d'outre-mer or COM):

See also 
 Administrative divisions of France
 List of communes in France with over 20,000 inhabitants
 List of communes in France with over 20,000 inhabitants (2006 census)
 List of communes in France (2008 version)